Montgérain is a commune in the Oise department in northern France.

Montgérain is located 40 km northeast of Beauvais and 23 km northwest of Compiègne. 
Its nearest neighbors are Saint-Martin-aux-Bois, Coivrel, and Ménévillers.
Other neighboring communities are Tricot to the north, Maignelay-Montigny to the northwest, and Wacquemoulin to the south.

See also
Communes of the Oise department

References

Communes of Oise